Diipetes are objects, likely meteorite fragments, with coincidental human and animal forms, venerated in Ancient Greece as "thrown by the gods". See also Acheiropoetos (literally ‘not-made-by-hand’), an early Judeo-Christian tradition, and icon.

Examples 
 Diipetes Xoano of Athena

Other uses 
The Diipetes Journal is a quarterly journal in Greek published in Greece covering classical paganism and Hellenic polytheism since 1991.

References 

Religious objects
Ancient Greek religion